Jahman Oladejo Anikulapo (born 16 January 1963) is a Nigerian journalist and culture archivist.

Biography 
Anikulapo is a Nigerian. He studied theatre arts in University of Ibadan. He began his art journalism career at The Guardian as the arts and media editor in 1993. He worked as the arts and media editor until 2003, then worked as the Editor of The Guardian on Sunday and The GuardianLife Magazine from 2003 to 2013.

References 

Nigerian journalists
Living people
1963 births